"Everyday Life" is a song by British rock band Coldplay from their eighth studio album of the same name. It was released on 3 November 2019 and sent to United Kingdom and Italy's contemporary hit radio as a promotional single in the following weeks. The track appears on the Sunset side of the album, being written by the band members and produced by The Dream Team.

Music video
The music video premiered on South Africa's Soweto TV and then made available globally on YouTube on 9 December 2019. It was directed by Karena Evans and shot between South Africa, Morocco and Ukraine. The introduction is accompanied by a voiceover explaining the concept of "ubuntu" a Xhosa word which means "humanity" in direct translation: "basically, you’ll always need the next person. You know what I mean? So one hand washes the other, the one hand does need the other to clean. That is Ubuntu. To help others, your brothers, your sisters. Even when they are strangers and you don’t know them, you are supposed to help them".

Live performances 
The song's live premiere was held on the 2 November 2019 episode of NBC's Saturday Night Live, which was hosted by American actress Kristen Stewart. A second performance at the Annie Mac Show on BBC Radio 1 happened in on 27 November 2019.

Critical reception 
Rob Arcand of Spin magazine called the song a return to form, stating that "[i]t's a heartfelt return to the kind of lush balladry that the band built their reputation on, with gorgeous production and performance elements lending weight to the kind of broad, arena-rock universalisms present in the lyrics."

Personnel
Credits adapted from Tidal.

Coldplay
 Guy Berryman – bass guitar
 Will Champion – drums, percussion, backing vocals
 Jonny Buckland – guitar
 Chris Martin – keyboards, vocals
Additional musicians
 Jacob Collier – backing vocals
 Marianna Champion – backing vocals
 Daniel Green – keyboards
 Rik Simpson – keyboards
 John Metcalfe – strings

Production
 Bill Rahko – producer
 Daniel Green – producer, programmer
 Rik Simpson – producer, programmer
 Jacob Collier – additional engineer
 Angel Lopez – additional production
 Frederico Vindver – additional production
 Emily Lazar – mastering
 Chris Allgood – assistant mastering
 Mark "Spike" Stent – mixing
 Matt Wolach – assistant mixing
 Michael Freeman – assistant mixing

Charts

Release history

References 

2010s ballads
2019 singles
2019 songs
Coldplay songs
Parlophone singles
Songs written by Chris Martin
Songs written by Guy Berryman
Songs written by Jonny Buckland
Songs written by Will Champion